A haveli is a historic private mansion in India or Pakistan.

Haveli may also refer to:

Haveli (novel), a 1993 novel by Suzanne Fisher Staples
Haveli, Pune, a town in Pune District, Maharashtra, India
Haveli taluka, a taluka or tehsil in Haveli subdivision, Pune District, Maharashtra, India
Haveli District, a district of Azad Kashmir, Pakistan 
Haveli Lakha, a town in Okara District, Punjab, Pakistan
Haveli Tehsil, Jammu and Kashmir, India

See also